The Scales of Justice was a series of thirteen British cinema featurettes produced between 1962 and 1967 for Anglo-Amalgamated at Merton Park Studios in London. The first nine episodes were made in black and white, the last four in colour. The final episode, Payment in Kind, was Merton Park's last production.

They were based on actual criminal cases and each film was introduced by crime writer Edgar Lustgarten. The series derives its title from the symbolic scales held by the statue of Justice, which is situated above the dome of London's Central Criminal Court, The Old Bailey.  In the opening narration she is described as having '...in her right hand, the Sword of Power and Retribution, and in her left – The Scales of Justice'. The first six episodes' opening scenes were narrated by Michael Hordern.

The end version of the theme music for the series (by Johnny Douglas) was performed by The Tornados.  It was re-recorded and released as the 'B' side of their single "The Ice Cream Man".

The series became even more widely known in the UK when it was broadcast as a TV series in various ITV regions during the 1970s and since. In July 2017 the series commenced on the free-to-air television channel Talking Pictures TV.

In October 2012 Network released the complete series as a two-disc DVD set.

Episode guide

External links
 

Scales of Justice
British crime films
1960s crime films
1960s British films